Waisale Vatuvoka (born 10 November 1983 in Suva, Fiji) is a Fijian rugby union footballer.  He plays in the halfback position for his club, Highlanders and is also a member of the 2010 Fiji Warriors.

See also
Fiji national rugby union team
Fiji Warriors
2009 end of year rugby tests

External links
 Fiji Rugby profile

1983 births
Living people
Fijian rugby union players
Fiji international rugby union players
Sportspeople from Suva
I-Taukei Fijian people